John Griesemer (born 5 December 1947 in Elizabeth, New Jersey) is an American author, journalist, and actor. He lives with his wife Faith Catlin and two children in New Hampshire. He is best known for his novel Signal and Noise.

Life 
John Griesemer graduated from the Peddie School in New Jersey and Dickinson College in Pennsylvania. He first worked as a journalist for local newspapers. While working for a newspaper in Lebanon, New Hampshire, he wrote an article about a local theatre company. The director persuaded him to work for that local theatre company. He did so for two years, playing everything from Romeo in Romeo and Juliet to children's theater. This way he came to the theater and the movies.

After moving to New York City in 1977 he studied acting with Robert Lewis. He acted in the films Malcolm X, Days of Thunder and The Crucible, along with the miniseries The Langoliers.

He also wrote short stories and novels. In 2000 he published his first novel No One Thinks of Greenland which was adapted into film in 2005 as Guy X. His novel Signal & Noise, which deals with transatlantic telephone cables, was on the bestseller list for several weeks.

Novels 
 Signal & Noise
 No One Thinks of Greenland

References

External links

External links

1947 births
Living people
21st-century American novelists